Franziska Steffen (born August 25, 1981) is an Indonesian-born Swiss freestyle skier, specializing in ski cross and a former alpine skier.

Steffen competed at the 2010 Winter Olympics for Switzerland. She placed 29th in the qualifying round in ski cross, to advance to the knockout stages. She failed to finish her first round heat, and did not advance.

As of April 2013, her only finish at the World Championships is 13th, in 2005.

Steffen made her World Cup debut in January 2003. As of April 2013, she has one World Cup victory, coming at Pozza di Fassa in 2003/04. Her best World Cup overall finish in ski cross is 2nd, in 2003/04.

World Cup Podiums

References

1981 births
Living people
Olympic freestyle skiers of Switzerland
Freestyle skiers at the 2010 Winter Olympics
Indonesian female freestyle skiers
Swiss female freestyle skiers